Ransom Everglades School is an independent, non-profit, co-educational, college-preparatory day school serving grades six to twelve in Coconut Grove in Miami, Florida. It formed with the merger in 1974 of the Everglades School for Girls and the Ransom School for Boys. It's described as a college preparatory school and 100% of Ransom Everglades' students attend a four-year institution after graduation.

Admission to the school is selective and tuition costs $43,420 per year (2021–22).  Tuition includes lunch and most fees except for books. A significant, need-based financial aid program is available. Graduating classes each year range between 150 and 160 students.  All students matriculate to four year universities; typically, more than 85% of graduating students continue on to out-of-state colleges and universities.

Ransom Everglades is fully accredited by the Southern Association of Independent Schools and the Southern Association of Colleges and Schools (AdvancED). Membership is held in the Southern and National Associations for College Admission Counseling, the National Association of Independent Schools, the College Entrance Examination Board, the Enrollment Management Association, the Council for Spiritual and Ethical Education, the Global Online Academy, the Mastery Transcript Consortium, and the Independent Curriculum Group, among other educational organizations.  The school appeared as the #1 Private High School in Florida in the 2018 Niche rankings.

History 
Paul C. Ransom, an educator and New York lawyer, opened Pine Knot Camp in 1896 as a school for boys in Coconut Grove. In 1902 he combined that with a campus in the Adirondacks of New York to create the Adirondack-Florida School, the first migratory boarding school.  Ransom emphasized a curriculum based on experiential learning. Students attended classes on the Florida campus in the winter and on the New York campus in fall and spring. The school suspended operations during World War II. After the war the school reopened in 1947. In 1949 the Adirondack campus was shut down and the school continued in Coconut Grove as the Ransom School for Boys. Ransom School changed from a boarding to a day school in 1972. Its counterpart, the Everglades School for Girls, began in 1955 founded by Marie B. Swenson. The schools merged and took its current name in 1974.

The school continues to be influenced and guided by the values of its founders.  Ransom's letter to prospective students, stating an interest only in boys who "believe that they are in the world not so much for what they can get out of it as for what they can put into it" is read to the students at the beginning of the year by the Head of School.

Meanwhile, inspired by the philosophy of Marie B. Swenson, who opened the Everglades School for Girls to all students, regardless of race, religion, or ethnicity, the school today values a diverse community of learners.  According to the school profile, 50% of students hail from multicultural backgrounds and more than 20% speak a language other than English at home.  A financial aid program is able to meet the demonstrated need of all qualified students once they are admitted.

Ransom Everglades has longstanding community partnerships with Breakthrough Miami, St. Alban's Child Enrichment Center, Booker T. Washington High School, ARC of South Florida, MUVE and the Reclamation Project, and many other community organizations.  After a devastating earthquake struck Haiti in January 2010, students at Ransom Everglades raised almost $30,000 which they donated to relief efforts in that country.

Campuses 
The school occupies two campuses. The "Upper School" (Ransom Campus) serves grades nine through twelve and is located on Main Highway on the shore of Biscayne Bay, the site of the original Pine Knot Camp. This makes it the oldest South Florida school still in its original location. The original site of the Everglades School for Girls is now the "Middle School" campus (Everglades Campus), serving grades six through eight and located on South Bayshore Drive, about one and a half miles from the Upper School. It is not on the water but is in a residential neighborhood and a mile away from the restaurants and shops of Coconut Grove.

Three early twentieth century buildings still stand on the Ransom campus. The pagoda was built in 1902. It was once the whole school—the place where the original students both learned and lived.  Now, the building serves as the Head of School's office, an event and study space, and faculty offices. It's often featured in historic pictures of South Miami, and in 1973 was listed in the National Register of Historic Places.  Like the Pagoda, the "Ransom Cottage" is constructed from local materials, largely Dade County pine, and is also on the National Register of Historic Places.  Built in 1906, the cottage has been used as the infirmary, the Headmaster's residence, and the band room.  Restored in 1998, now the cottage is a conference room and meeting space.  In June 2016, Ransom Everglades acquired the La Brisa property adjacent to the Ransom Campus.  The 6.9 acre campus includes a restored 1920s home that sits 23 feet above sea level.  According to Penny Townsend, the then-Head of School, the acquisition of the campus would allow the school to "improve [its] facilities, add vital greenspace and continue [its] long tradition of respecting, protecting and learning from the treasures of Old Florida and Miami’s precious coastal ecosystems.”

Both Campuses are featured in the 1998 movie Wild Things.

Academics 
The school offers more than 20 Advanced Placement courses each year, and typically 90% or more of the 900+ AP exams taken each year result in a score of 3 or better.  Recently, the school replaced some of its AP classes with "Advanced classes" which are at a higher level and allow students to take the AP exam at the end of the academic year. In the Fall of 2018, 16 Ransom Everglades seniors were named National Merit Semi-Finalists.

Athletics 
The school has a comprehensive athletic program with over 70 teams among 18 interscholastic sports. Ransom Everglades has fielded state championship teams in recent years in Water Polo (2014, 2015, 2016, 2019), Soccer (2015, 2016), Tennis (2014, 2018), and Volleyball (2013).

Notable alumni 
 Butch Brickell - Racing driver and stuntman notable for his work in such movies as 2 Fast 2 Furious, True Lies, and others
 Majandra Delfino - Actress on Roswell TV series 
 Pamela Druckerman - Writer and journalist
 Marc Fein - Sports broadcaster 
 Jeffry P. Freundlich (pen name: Jeff Lindsay) - writer of the Darkly Dreaming Dexter series, which has been adapted into the hit television series Dexter. The school is part of the fifth novel of the series, Dexter is Delicious, with some of the characters being Ransom Everglades students.
 Timothy Greenfield-Sanders - Documentary filmmaker and portrait photographer
Lillian Guerra - Author, widely published historian, and Professor at the University of Florida
 Debby Herbenick - Research scientist in sexuality at Indiana University. Sex advice columnist, writer, and blogger 
 Ashleigh Johnson - Olympic Gold Medalist member of the 2016 United States women's national water polo team
 Phillip Lord - Oscar-winning director of the films Cloudy With a Chance of Meatballs, 21 Jump Street, The Lego Movie, and Spider-Man: Into the Spider-Verse.
 Mike Malinin - Drummer for the Goo Goo Dolls since 1995.
 Robert Malval - 5th Prime Minister of Haiti
 Jeanine Mason - Winner of Season 5 of Fox's So You Think You Can Dance.
 Jay Pierrepont Moffat - Diplomat, historian, statesman.
 Dan Otero - New York Yankees pitcher
 Skylar Satenstein - cosmetic surgeon, inspiration for Good Will Hunting
 Arlene Sierra - Composer.
 Sam Singer (born 1995) - American-Israeli basketball player for Israeli team Bnei Herzliya
 Laurinda Hope Spear - Founder of Arquitectonica.
 Devi Sridhar - Professor of global public health at the University of Edinburgh
 (Andrea) Ondi Timoner- film director, only director to win Sundance Grand Jury award twice
 Jordi Vilasuso - Cuban-American award-winning soap opera actor
 Carlos Watson - Television host
 Bruce Weitz - Actor, best known as undercover cop Sgt. Michael "Mick" Belker in the 1980s TV series Hill Street Blues
 Sloan Wilson - Author, most notable for his novel The Man in the Gray Flannel Suit
 Pamela Golbin - Curator, author and fashion historian
 Rachel Feinstein (artist) - American artist

References 
Notes

Bibliography

 Blanc, Giulio, editor. Ransom Everglades; Reflections of a School, 1893-1978. Miami: Banyan Books (1979)
 Headley, Gwyn (1996) Architectural Follies in America. 
 Klepser, Carolyn and Arva Moore Parks (2002) Miami Then and Now (Then & Now). Thunder Bay Press, 
 Liles, Harriet, editor. Miami Diary 1896. (no place, no publisher) (1996)
 Lovejoy, Clarence Earle (1963) Lovejoy's Prep School Guide
 Peterson's (2008) Private Secondary Schools 2008. 
 Pincus, Laura and Arva Moore Parks. (2003) Honor & Excellence: A Century Of Ransom Everglades School. Centennial Press, 
 Parks, Avra Moore and Munroe, Ralph (2004) The Forgotten Frontier: Florida Through the Lens of Ralph Middleton Munroe. 
 Plasencia, Alex (2011) "A History of West Coconut Grove from 1925: Slum Clearance, Concrete Monsters, and the Dichotomy of East and West Coconut Grove". Clemson University: Tiger Prints

External links 
 2006 Best Private School awarded by Miami New Times
 Privateschoolsreport.com statistics
 Ransom Everglades School history web page
 Ransom Everglades Athletics
 Ransom Everglades School Tuition
 

Private schools in Miami-Dade County, Florida
High schools in Miami-Dade County, Florida
Private high schools in Florida
Coconut Grove (Miami)
Private middle schools in Florida
Preparatory schools in Florida
1903 establishments in Florida
Schools in Miami